Christopher Leonard Hodgetts (born 6 December 1950 in Tanworth-in-Arden, Warwickshire) is a British former racing driver. He began his racing career in 1979, driving in the Clubman Class A championship.

BTCC career 

Hodgetts debuted in the British Touring Car Championship in 1980. His first overall podium place came in 1981 when he came second. He was consistent in the top five after that, mostly driving for the works Toyota team. He came fourth in 1983, fifth in 1984, second in 1985, before winning the series in 1986 and 1987 at the wheel of a Group C Toyota CorollaAE86. The 1988 season was not a success. The new Group A Toyota Supra needed a lot of development and only a handful of good results were gained. His last race in the BTCC was in 1990. That season he drove for the works Vauxhall team, helping to develop the new Vauxhall Cavalier. Towards the end of the year he switched to a Ford Sierra, before calling time on his BTCC career. During the 1989 season, Hodgetts was driving for Brooklyn in an iconic red Ford Sierra RS500.

After the BTCC 

Besides racing in touring cars, Hodgetts also found success in sports car racing. He shared the BRDC C2 Championship with Tim Harvey in 1989 before retiring and won the TVR Tuscan Challenge in 1990. The 1994 season saw Chris in the Rover Turbo Challenge. He also drove in the World Sportscar Championship on occasion and had seven starts in the 24 Hours of Le Mans, representing team such as Mazdaspeed, Courage Compétition and Spice Engineering. He had a best finish of 7th place overall in the classic 24 hour race. In 1995 he won the GT2 title in the British GT Championship, driving a Marcos LM600. He retired after 1998, when he drove a Lola in the ISRS.

Hodgetts now works for Racing Team & Drivers as a driver instructor. His son Stefan raced in the BTCC in 2004.

Racing record

Complete British Saloon / Touring Car Championship results
(key) (Races in bold indicate pole position – 1980–1990 in class) (Races in italics indicate fastest lap – 1 point awarded ?–1989 in class)

‡ – Endurance driver

References

Chris Hodgetts at btcc-racing.com

External links
Official website

1950 births
Living people
British Touring Car Championship drivers
British Touring Car Championship Champions
British Formula 3000 Championship drivers
24 Hours of Le Mans drivers
People from Tanworth-in-Arden
British GT Championship drivers
World Sportscar Championship drivers
24 Hours of Spa drivers
Britcar 24-hour drivers